Hicksville High School is an American high school in the town of Hicksville, New York, in Nassau County. It is the only high school in the Hicksville Union Free School District. It opened in 1953.

As of the 2016–17 school year, the school had an enrollment of 1,705 students. The principal of the school is Raymond Williams, who became principal in the 2013–2014 school year. This is a coed public school and does not have a mandatory dress code.

Demographics
The student body is 53 percent male and 47 percent female, and the total minority enrollment is 54 percent. Hicksville High School offers grades 9–12 and special education. With 115 full-time teachers, there is a 15:1 student-teacher ratio. Hicksville High School has a 90% graduation rate. 12% of students are enrolled in the Free Lunch program, and 6% are enrolled in the Reduced Price Lunch program.

Notable alumni
 Lorraine Bracco (born 1954), actress
 Theresa Caputo (born 1966), television personality
 Bruce Goldstein (born 1952), film programmer
 Billy Joel (born 1949), singer-songwriter and pianist (did not graduate)
 Tim Parker (born 1993), soccer player
 The Lemon Twigs (born 1997 & 1999), pop/rock band

References

Oyster Bay (town), New York
Schools in Nassau County, New York
Public high schools in New York (state)